Boneyard Beach may refer to:

Boneyard Beach (Florida), a beach on Big Talbot Island
Boneyard Beach (South Carolina), a beach on Bulls Island
Boneyard Beach (album), a 1995 album by American band Dish